Montgomery was a constituency in the House of Commons of England and later in the House of Commons of the Parliament of the United Kingdom. It elected one Member, but was abolished in 1918.

After 1832 the constituency was more usually called the Montgomery Boroughs or Montgomery District of Boroughs.

Boundaries

1885–1918
The constituency comprised the boroughs of Montgomery, Llanfyllin, Llanidloes, Newtown and Welshpool.

Members of Parliament

1542–1640

1601–1918

Elections

Elections in the 1830s

The election was declared void on petition, causing a by-election.

Elections in the 1840s

With both Cholmondeley and Pugh receiving the same number of votes, both were declared elected by the returning officer. However, Cholmondeley decided against defending his claim for the seat and Pugh was declared the only elected candidate.

Elections in the 1850s

Elections in the 1860s
Pugh's death caused a by-election.

Willes-Johnson's death caused a by-election.

Elections in the 1870s

Hanbury-Tracy succeeded to the peerage, becoming Lord Sudeley.

Elections in the 1880s

Elections in the 1890s

Elections in the 1900s

Elections in the 1910s 

General Election 1914/15:

Another General Election was required to take place before the end of 1915. The political parties had been making preparations for an election to take place and by the July 1914, the following candidates had been selected; 
Unionist: Edward Pryce-Jones
Liberal: A E O Humphreys Owen

References 

D Brunton & D H Pennington, Members of the Long Parliament (London: George Allen & Unwin, 1954)
Cobbett's Parliamentary history of England, from the Norman Conquest in 1066 to the year 1803 (London: Thomas Hansard, 1808) 
 The Constitutional Year Book for 1913 (London: National Union of Conservative and Unionist Associations, 1913)
 F W S Craig, British Parliamentary Election Results 1832–1885 (2nd edition, Aldershot: Parliamentary Research Services, 1989)

Montgomeryshire
Historic parliamentary constituencies in Mid Wales
Constituencies of the Parliament of the United Kingdom established in 1542
Constituencies of the Parliament of the United Kingdom disestablished in 1918